Gemmula granosus is a species of sea snail, a marine gastropod mollusk in the family Turridae, the turrids.

Description
The length of the shell attains 27 mm.

Distribution
This marine species occurs in the Western Pacific.

References

External links
  Tucker, J.K. 2004 Catalog of recent and fossil turrids (Mollusca: Gastropoda). Zootaxa 682:1-1295.

granosus
Gastropods described in 1779